The Law on the Expiration of the Punitive Claims of the State, called in short the Expiry Law granted an amnesty of sorts to the military who eventually committed crimes against humanity during the civic-military dictatorship of Uruguay. It was implemented as an ad-hoc solution to a political crisis with the background of military resistance to the Uruguayan redemocratization process in course.

This law was proposed by the first government of Julio María Sanguinetti, co-written by legislators of the two main political parties, Colorado and National, supported by the main opposition leader, Wilson Ferreira Aldunate, and heavily opposed by the Broad Front and other political and social organizations. It was passed by the Uruguayan Parliament on 22 December 1986 and published with the number 15848.

This law was extremely controversial in nature, and was kept in force for a long time: in 1989 and 2009, Uruguayans voted in referendums and decided twice to keep the law, which detractors considered as plain impunity. It was finally repealed in 2011 by law number 18831.

References

External links

 Texto de la Ley 15.848 de la Caducidad de la Pretensión Punitiva del Estado. 
 Texto de la Ley 15.737 de Amnistía de Todos los Delitos Políticos, Comunes y Militares conexos con éstos. 

1986 in Uruguay
1986 in politics
1986 in law
Civic-military dictatorship of Uruguay
Law of Uruguay
Human rights in Uruguay
Julio María Sanguinetti